The North Carolina Public Radio Association is a statewide collaborative of sixteen public radio stations.

The association members include:

 Public Radio East, New Bern Public Radio for Eastern North Carolina
 WCPE, Raleigh The Classical Station
 WCQS, Asheville The Mountain Air Network
 WDAV, Davidson 89.9 Classical Public Radio
 WFAE, Charlotte’s NPR News Source
 WFDD, The Piedmont and High Country's Public Radio Station
 WFSS, Fayetteville NPR News & Jazz Music
 WHQR, Wilmington Radio with Vision…Listen & See
 WNCU, Durham Jazz Radio
 WNCW, Spindale Broadcasting a World of Music
 WRVS-FM, Elizabeth City Your Community Voice
 WUNC (FM), Chapel HIll North Carolina Public Radio

References

External links 
North Carolina Public Radio Association home page